Tales from the Crypt is an American radio series spun off from the HBO series of the same name based on the 1950s EC Comics, which ran for eight episodes in 2000.

History
In 2000, several Tales from the Crypt "radio shows" were recorded for Seeing Ear Theatre, an online subsidiary of The Sci-Fi Channel, and were offered free as streaming RealAudio files on their website, as well as for sale on Audible.com. Featuring most of the same producers from the HBO series and John Kassir reprising the role of The Cryptkeeper, 13 episodes were planned (with forthcoming episodes listed as "TBA"), but ultimately only 8 stories were recorded.  

Seven of the eight shows were released on CD in 2002 by Highbridge Audio ("This Trick'll Kill You" was omitted from the CD set).  The Sci-Fi Channel removed the Seeing Ear Theatre section of their website in 2007 and Seeing Ear Theatre shows are no longer available from Audible.com, but surreptitiously recorded copies of all of the episodes have surfaced on various filesharing sites.  

At the 2006 San Diego Comic-Con International Crypt reunion panel, President of Tales from the Crypt Holdings Jack Wohl revealed plans to record further episodes for either Sirius Satellite Radio or XM Satellite Radio, but finding investors was cited as problematic and it ultimately never came to fruition.

Theme song
The series utilized the same theme music by Danny Elfman that opened each episode of the HBO series, but it now included lyrics by Jack Wohl which were sung at the opening of each episode by the Cryptkeeper (John Kassir):

Welcome fiends to creepy scenes of eeriness and gore
Unearthly moans from rattling bones behind each creaking door
It's more than boo that'll frighten you; I long to hear your cries
You won't survive the tale that I've so ghoulishly devised
Dark and haunted, these undaunted Tales from the Crypt!

Episodes

Additional credits
Associate Producer: Laurissa James
Sound Design: John Colucci
Series Story Editor: Tony Daniel
Live Foley SFX by Sue Zizza and David Shinn
Sound Engineers: Jane Pipik and Miles B. Smith
"Tales From The Crypt" series theme composed by Danny Elfman
Lyrics by Jack Wohl
Arrangement of series theme and original score by Ohad Talmor

References

American radio dramas
2000s American radio programs